The canton of Chaumont-1 is an administrative division of the Haute-Marne department, northeastern France. It was created at the French canton reorganisation which came into effect in March 2015. Its seat is in Chaumont.

It consists of the following communes:
Brethenay
Chaumont (partly)
Condes
Euffigneix
Jonchery
Riaucourt
Treix

References

Cantons of Haute-Marne